Carlos Echeverri Cortés (23 June 1900 – 14 March 1974) was a Colombian economist and diplomat who served as ad interim fifth Permanent Representative of Colombia to the United Nations, and as Ambassador of Colombia to Peru and Mexico. During his ambassadorship in Peru he became an enemy of the administration of President Manuel Arturo Odría Amoretti for granting political asylum to the politician Víctor Raúl Haya de la Torre, an action that drove the Peruvian Government to mount a five-year struggle harassing embassy staff and personnel, and forming a military blockade around the Colombian Embassy where Haya was housed, this because Lima had refused to grant safe conduct for Haya to leave the country and Ambassador Echeverri refused to give him up.

Recognitions
 Order of the Aztec Eagle - Band (1949)

See also
 Juan Carlos Echeverry Garzón

References

1900 births
1973 deaths
People from Bogotá
Permanent Representatives of Colombia to the United Nations
Ambassadors of Colombia to Peru
Ambassadors of Colombia to Mexico
Colombian Conservative Party politicians